Christina Morales (born April 13, 1968) is a Texas Democratic politician serving in the Texas House of Representatives for district 145.

Personal life
Morales' grandfather, Felix H. Morales, opened KLVL the first Spanish speaking radio station that reported news for the Gulf Coast. At the age of 23, following the death of her grandmother, Morales took over the funeral home ran by the family. Morales has 2 children and 2 twin grandchildren. She is Hispanic

Community involvement
Morales, in 1997, founded the Annual Morales Back to School Supplies Giveaway. The program helps low income children in Houston get supplies needed for school. Morales serves as CEO of the program.

Political career
In the spring of 2019, Morales was elected to represent district 145 in the Texas House of Representatives. She was sworn in on March 18, 2019 succeeding Carol Alvarado. Additionally, Morales has served as a board member of several organizations. She is affiliated with the Democratic Party.

References

Politicians from Houston
21st-century American politicians
21st-century American women politicians
Women state legislators in Texas
Hispanic and Latino American state legislators in Texas
Hispanic and Latino American women in politics
Democratic Party members of the Texas House of Representatives
Living people
1968 births